Ágnes Studer (born September 10, 1998) is a Hungarian basketball player for Atomerőmű KSC Szekszárd and the Hungarian national team.

She participated at the EuroBasket Women 2019.

References

1998 births
Living people
Hungarian women's basketball players
People from Szekszárd
Point guards
Sportspeople from Tolna County